In the Domain Name System, a Uniform Resource Identifier (URI) record (RFC 7553) is a means for publishing mappings from hostnames to URIs.

Record format 

The URI record is expressed in a master file in the following format:

_service._proto.name. TTL class URI priority weight target.

where:

 service: the symbolic name of the desired service.
 proto: the transport protocol of the desired service; this is usually either TCP or UDP.
 name: the domain name for which this record is valid, ending in a dot.
 TTL: standard DNS time to live field.
 class: standard DNS class field (this is always IN).
 priority: the priority of the target host, lower value means more preferred.
 weight: A relative weight for records with the same priority, higher value means more preferred.
 target: This field holds the URI of the target, enclosed in double-quote characters ('"'), where the URI is as specified in RFC 3986

An example DNS URI resource record 

_ftp._tcp.example.com.   3600 IN URI 10 1 "ftp://ftp1.example.com/public"

See also 

 List of DNS record types

References 
  - The Uniform Resource Identifier (URI) DNS Resource Record
  - Uniform Resource Identifier (URI): Generic Syntax

DNS record types